Elvira Presents Haunted Hits is a compilation album of Halloween songs.  It was first issued in 1988, and is "presented" by Elvira.  Subsequent albums were Elvira Presents Monster Hits and Elvira Presents Revenge of the Monster Hits.

Track listing
 "Monster Mash" - Bobby 'Boris' Pickett & The Crypt-Kickers
 "Haunted House" - Jumpin' Gene Simmons
 "Ghostbusters" theme song - Ray Parker Jr.
 "Out of Limits" - The Marketts
 "The Blob" - The Five Blobs
 "Creature from the Black Lagoon" - Dave Edmunds
 "Purple People Eater" - Sheb Wooley
 "The Addams Family Theme" - Vic Mizzy
 "Welcome to My Nightmare" - Alice Cooper
 "Twilight Zone" - Neil Norman & His Cosmic Orchestra
 "Dead Man's Party" - Oingo Boingo
 "Halloween Spooks" - Lambert, Hendricks & Ross
 "Horror Movie" - Skyhooks
 "I Put a Spell on You" - Screamin' Jay Hawkins
 "I Was a Teenage Werewolf" - The Cramps
 "Voodoo Voodoo" - LaVern Baker
 "Full Moon" - Elvira

References

1988 compilation albums
Halloween albums